Jean-Louis Fournier (born 19 December 1938, Calais) is a French writer, and winner of the Prix Femina, 2008, for Où on va, papa?.

Biography
Jean Louis Fournier is the son of Dr Paul Léandre Emile Fournier and his wife Marie-Thérèse Françoise Camille Fournier née Delcourt.
In 2009, Fournier published his book Où On Va Papa?, in which he writes about the relationship between him and his two handicapped sons, Mathieu and Thomas. The book won him the Prix Femina; however, its controversial nature meant it had many critics, including the mother of the two boys.

Works
Grammaire française et impertinente, Payot, 1992, 
Le curriculum vitae de Dieu, Seuil, 1995, 
Les mots des riches, les mots des pauvres, Anne Carrière, 2004, 
Le Petit Meaulnes, LGF/Le Livre de Poche, 2004, 
Où on va, papa?, Stock, 2008, 
Where We Going, Daddy?: Life with Two Sons Unlike Any Other, Translator Adriana Hunter, Other Press, 2010, 
Veuf, Stock, 2011,

References

People from Calais
1938 births
Living people
20th-century French novelists
21st-century French novelists
Prix Femina winners
French male novelists
20th-century French male writers
21st-century French male writers